The 2006 Kamchatka earthquake occurred on . This shock had a moment magnitude of 7.6 and a maximum Mercalli intensity of X (Extreme). The hypocenter was located near the coast of Koryak Autonomous Okrug at an estimated depth of 22 km, as reported by the International Seismological Centre. This event caused damage in three villages and was followed by a number of large aftershocks. Two M6.6 earthquakes struck on April 29 at 16:58 UTC and again on May 22 at 11:12 UTC. These earthquakes caused no deaths; however, 40 people were reported injured.

Tectonic setting
The northern part of the Kamchatka Peninsula lies away from the convergent boundaries of the Kuril–Kamchatka Trench and the Aleutian Trench but across the boundary between two blocks within the North American Plate, the Kolyma-Chukotka and Bering Sea microplates. This boundary accommodates both active shortening and right lateral strike-slip across a series of large SW–NE trending faults.

Earthquake
The focal mechanism of the earthquake was consistent with reverse faulting on a northwest-dipping fault. Fieldwork carried out immediately after the earthquake and in the following summer identified a 140 km long zone of surface rupture. This rupture consisted of a series of en echelon surface breaks. The type of observed displacement varied from dominantly reverse faulting to oblique reverse-right lateral to dominantly strike-slip. The vertical component of displacement was locally in the range 4–5 m, the horizontal component was always less than 3 m.

See also
List of earthquakes in 2006
List of earthquakes in Russia
Kamchatka earthquakes
Kamchatka Peninsula

References

External links
The earthquakes on Kamchatka РИА "Новости" 
M7.6 - near the east coast of Koryakskiy Autonomnyy Okrug, Russia – United States Geological Survey

Earthquake 2006
Kamchatka
Earthquake, Kamchatka 2006
Earthquake 2006 
2006 
April 2006 events in Russia